Mammitum, Mammitu or Mammi was a Mesopotamian goddess viewed as the wife of Nergal, the god of death. Mammitum's name might mean “oath” or “frost” (based on similarity to the Akkadian word mammû, "ice" or "frost"). In the earliest sources she is Nergal's most commonly attested wife, but from the Kassite period onward she was often replaced in this role by the goddess Laṣ.

As her name is homophonous with Mami, a goddess of birth or "divine midwife," some researchers assume they are one and the same. However, it has been proven that they were separate deities, and they are kept apart in ancient Mesopotamian god lists. A goddess named Mamma known from Mari is most likely related to the divine midwife Mami rather than to Mammitum. Another being from Mesopotamian beliefs with a homophonous name was māmītu, a type of underworld demon with a goat's head and human hands and feet, known from the late text Underworld Vision of an Assyrian Prince and absent from other sources. Unlike deities, who were generally fully antropomorphic in Mesopotamian beliefs, demonic beings were often hybrids.

Mammitum was worshiped in Kutha, where she was likely introduced alongside Erra, a god syncretised with Nergal. She also received offerings in the Ekur temple complex in Nippur alongside her husband.

The god list An = Anum mentions both Mamitum and Laṣ, and equates them with each other. However, in the so-called Nippur god list Laṣ occurs separately from Nergal, while Mammitum is listed alongside him. In at least one text, a description of a New Year ritual from Babylon during which the gods of Kish (Zababa), Kutha (Nergal) and Borsippa (Nabu) and their entourages were believed to visit Marduk (at the time not yet a major god), both she and Laṣ appear side by side as two separate goddesses.

In the Epic of Erra, Mammitum appears as the wife of the eponymous god, who is referred both as Erra and Nergal at various points in the known manuscripts.

References

Bibliography

Underworld goddesses
Mesopotamian goddesses